"Premium Harmony" is a short story by American author Stephen King. It was published in the November 2009 issue of The New Yorker magazine. The story is set in Castle Rock, King's famous fictitious city; in "Premium Harmony" the city is almost abandoned and run-down.

Plot summary
While en route to Wal-Mart for grass seed, Ray and Mary Burkett, with their dog Biznezz in the back seat, fight about the state of their lawn, his smoking, and her obesity.  Mary demands they stop at a convenience store in order for her to purchase a purple kickball for their niece's birthday, and while Ray and the dog are waiting in the car, Mary suffers a heart attack in the store and immediately dies. Ray is fetched from the car by a store employee.  The emergency medical technicians arrive, pronounce her dead, and remove her body.  Ray remains with the store employees and customers, recounting Mary's County Fair awards for her quilting.  After nearly two hours have passed, he returns to the car, where Biznezz has died from the extreme heat in the car, with the remnants of a Sno Ball Ray had fed him earlier still in his whiskers.  This causes in Ray a simultaneous welling-up of "great sadness" and "amusement".  The story is written in third-person limited narrative and reveals a number of Ray's more egocentric thoughts throughout the story's events, such as being disturbed at the similarity between the manager's attempts at mouth-to-mouth resuscitation and French kissing, the thought that a bystander might give him a mercy fuck, and, as the story closes, the thought that he can now smoke whatever, whenever, and wherever he likes.

See also
 Stephen King short fiction bibliography

References

Short stories by Stephen King
2009 short stories
Maine in fiction